Trebište, Trebishte, or Trebišta (the pronunciation used by the local population is Trebišča) is a village in North Macedonia in Mavrovo and Rostuša Municipality, situated in the Dolna Reka district, on the eastern slopes of Dešat, above the gorge of Radika. It historically has been identified as a Mijak village.

History

In 1426 Albanian nobleman Gjon Kastrioti and his three sons (one being Skanderbeg) donated the right to the proceeds from taxes collected from the villages Rostuša and Trebište and from the church of Saint Mary, which was in one of them, to Hilandar. In the Ottoman defter of 1467, the village of Trabishta is recorded as part of the ziamet of Reka which was under the authority of Karagöz Bey. The village had a total of 15 households and the anthroponymy recorded was overwhelmingly Slavic in character, although instances of Slavicisation are easily identifiable. For example, the patronymic Bukurovići is attested in three household heads and is derived from the Albanian bukur ("beautiful") and Slavic suffix -ovići, likewise, the patronymic Tanušovići is recorded and is derived from the Albanian personal name Tanush with the addition of the same Slavic suffix. In 1519, 55 Christian Orthodox families were recorded in the village, while in 1583, the village had 41 Christian Orthodox families and 5 Muslim families.

In the 19th century, Trebište was a mixed Macedonian (Christian)-Pomak (Muslim) village in the district of Dolna Reka, then part of the Ottoman Empire.

Demographics
Trebište has traditionally been inhabited by Orthodox Macedonians and a Muslim Macedonian (Torbeš) population.

According to the 2002 census, the village had a total of 765 inhabitants. Ethnic groups in the village include:

Macedonians 303
Turks 277
Albanians 159
Bosniaks 18
Others 8

References

Villages in Mavrovo and Rostuša Municipality
Medieval Macedonia
Macedonian Muslim villages
Albanian communities in North Macedonia